The Plain Yellow Banner was one of the Eight Banners of Manchu military and society during the Later Jin and Qing dynasty of China. The Plain Yellow Banner was one of three "upper" banner armies under the direct command of the emperor himself, and one of the four "right wing" banners. The Plain Yellow Banner was the original banner commanded personally by Nurhaci. The Plain Yellow Banner and the Bordered Yellow Banner were split from each other in 1615, when the troops of the original four banner armies (Yellow, Blue, Red, and White) were divided into eight by adding a bordered variant to each banner's design. After Nurhaci's death, his son Hong Taiji became khan, and took control of both yellow banners. Later, the Shunzhi Emperor took over the Plain White Banner after the death of his regent, Dorgon, to whom it previously belonged. From that point forward, the emperor directly controlled three "upper" banners (Plain Yellow, Bordered Yellow, and Plain White), as opposed to the other five "lower" banners.

The flag of the Plain Yellow Banner eventually became the basis of the Flag of the Qing dynasty.

Notable people
 Hešeri
 Sonin (regent)
 Yunsi
 Qishan (official)
 Clan Nara
 Consort Shu
 Tulišen
 Empress Xiaogongren, consort of the Kangxi Emperor
 Zu Dashou (Han)
 Geng Zhongming (Han)
 Tian Wenjing (Han)

Notable clans 

 Hešeri
 Geng 
 Zu
 Tian
 Clan Nara
 Ayan Gioro
 Uya
 Borjigin
 Šumuru
 Magiya
 Donggo
 Yanja
 Cheng
 Wumit
 Zheng
 Zhou 
 Wang
 Li
 Ejo

References

Bibliography

Further reading 
 

 

 
Plain Yellow Banner